
Gmina Błonie is an urban-rural gmina (administrative district) in Warsaw West County, Masovian Voivodeship, in east-central Poland.

Villages
Apart from the town of Błonie, Gmina Błonie contains the villages and settlements of Białutki, Białuty, Bieniewice, Bieniewo-Parcela, Bieniewo-Wieś, Błonie-Wieś, Bramki, Cesinek, Cholewy, Dębówka, Górna Wieś, Konstantów, Kopytów, Łąki, Łaźniew, Łaźniewek, Marysinek, Nowa Górna, Nowa Wieś, Nowe Faszczyce, Nowy Łuszczewek, Odrzywół, Pass, Piorunów, Radonice, Radzików, Radzików-Wieś, Rochaliki, Rokitno, Rokitno-Majątek, Stare Faszczyce, Stary Łuszczewek, Wawrzyszew, Witanów, Witki, Wola Łuszczewska and Żukówka.

Neighbouring gminas
Gmina Błonie is bordered by the gminas of Baranów, Brwinów, Grodzisk Mazowiecki, Leszno, Ożarów Mazowiecki and Teresin.

References

Polish official population figures 2006

Blonie
Warsaw West County